36S, 36-S or 36.S may refer to:

 Happy Camp Airport (FAA identifier: 36S), an airport in Siskiyou County, California, U.S.
 36th parallel south, a line of latitude
 Sulfur-36 (S-36 or 36S), an isotope of sulfur

See also
 S36 (disambiguation)